The following is the list of awards and nominations received by the American science fiction television series Star Trek: Enterprise.

ASCAP Film and Television Music Awards

Emmy Awards
The Emmy is a television production award considered the television equivalent to the Academy Award.

Creative Arts Emmy Awards

Hugo Awards

Saturn Awards
Awarded since 1972, the Saturn Awards is an annual accolade presented by the Academy of Science Fiction, Fantasy & Horror Films to honor science fiction and fantasy films and television shows. Star Trek: Enterprise has been nominated for seven awards, and won three of them. It was also awarded a Special Recognition Award for the work of all the Star Trek television series in 2005.

Visual Effects Society Awards

See also
 List of Star Trek: The Original Series awards and nominations
 List of Star Trek: The Next Generation awards and nominations
 List of Star Trek: Deep Space Nine awards and nominations
 List of Star Trek: Voyager awards and nominations
 List of Star Trek: Discovery awards and nominations

References

Enterprise
Awards